The Decade Volcanoes are 16 volcanoes identified by the International Association of Volcanology and Chemistry of the Earth's Interior (IAVCEI) as being worthy of particular study in light of their history of large, destructive eruptions and proximity to densely populated areas.  The Decade Volcanoes project encourages studies and public-awareness activities at these volcanoes, with the aim of achieving a better understanding of the volcanoes and the dangers they present, and thus being able to reduce the severity of natural disasters.

They are named Decade Volcanoes because the project was initiated in the 1990s as part of the United Nations–sponsored International Decade for Natural Disaster Reduction.

A volcano may be designated a Decade Volcano if it exhibits more than one volcanic hazard (people living near the Decade Volcanoes may experience tephra fall, pyroclastic flows, lava flows, lahars, volcanic edifice instability and lava dome collapse); shows recent geological activity; is located in a densely populated area (eruptions at any of the Decade Volcanoes may threaten tens or hundreds of thousands of people, and therefore mitigating eruption hazards at these volcanoes is crucial); is politically and physically accessible for study; and there is local support for the work.

Aims of the program

The general approach of Decade Volcano projects has been to convene a planning workshop, identify the major strengths and weaknesses of risk mitigation at each volcano, and to plan how to address the weaknesses identified.  One of the difficulties faced in mitigating hazards at volcanoes is ensuring that geoscientists and those who will enact the mitigation measures communicate adequately with each other, and the Decade Volcano program has attempted to ensure this by making sure both groups are well represented at Decade Volcano workshops.

Funding

Hopes that United Nations funding might be available for Decade Volcano projects did not come to fruition, and funding was sought instead from a variety of sources.  For example, Mexican scientific and civil defence bodies funded work at Colima, principally for Mexican scientists but also for a few foreign colleagues; major bilateral French-Indonesian and German-Indonesian programs were initiated at Merapi; and the European Union has provided funding for many of the studies carried out at European volcanoes.

One particular activity that has not been funded—because it typically is not allowable under most national or bilateral funding—is the exchange of scientists and civil defence leaders between the various Decade Volcano projects of developing countries, for example, between the Philippines and Indonesia, or between Mexico, Guatemala, and Colombia, or across the Pacific and Atlantic. Often, scientists and civil defence leaders from developing countries can relate better to each other's experiences than they can to the experience of counterparts from industrialized countries. Also, civil defence leaders who have experienced volcanic crises are far more credible witnesses, in the eyes of local civil defence leaders, than either local or visiting scientists might be.

Achievements

Since it was initiated, the Decade Volcano program has achieved a number of successes in predicting volcanic events and mitigating disasters.  One of the most notable was the successful diversion of a lava flow and blanket at Mount Etna in 1992.  The flow was threatening the town of Zafferana, and had overwhelmed several barriers placed perpendicular to its flow down a valley.  Scientists and civil defence leaders decided to try to dam the flow higher up, and did so by dropping large concrete blocks into a skylight in a lava tube which was feeding the flow.  The flow subsequently stopped short of Zafferana.

The program has significantly increased what is known about the Decade Volcanoes, some of which were very poorly studied before being designated.  The eruptive history of Galeras volcano is now much better established than previously, and at Taal Volcano the importance of water in driving its explosive eruptions has come to light.

Measures which have been taken to mitigate disasters which might be caused by future eruptions include a new law in the vicinity of Mount Rainier, requiring assessment of geological hazards before any new developments; limitations on high density housing developments in the Taal Caldera; and the development of an evacuation plan for parts of Naples which might be affected in the event of an eruption at Vesuvius.

Problems

Although studies at many Decade volcanoes have clearly reduced the risks faced by nearby settlements, eruptions at some of the Decade Volcanoes have demonstrated the difficulties faced by the program.  Eruptions at Mount Unzen which began shortly before it was designated a Decade Volcano were heavily monitored, but despite this, a large pyroclastic flow killed 43 people, including three volcanologists.

Later, a 1993 Decade Volcano conference in the city of Pasto, Colombia ended in disaster when several attending scientists mounted an impromptu expedition to the crater of Galeras.  An unexpected eruption while they were at the summit killed six scientists and three tourists.

Civil unrest in the vicinity of several of the Decade volcanoes has also interfered with the program. The civil war in Guatemala affected studies of Volcán Santa María until a ceasefire was called in 1996, while ongoing civil war in the Democratic Republic of the Congo has hampered studies of Nyiragongo volcano.  More generally, scarce resources for volcano studies have led to programs competing for limited funding.

Volcanoes selected 
 
The following volcanoes were selected as the 16 current Decade Volcanoes:

 Note: Population at risk of lava/lahar/ash flows during eruption, not including potential tsunami nor distant ashfall

See also 
 Timeline of volcanism on Earth

References

External links 
 

 
Geological hazards